This is the list of players who have played for Bashundhara Kings since its inception in 2013.

Current squad

Out on loan

List of players

Appearances and goals are for Bangladesh Football Premier League  matches only.

Statistics correct as of match played 28 February 2021

Table headers
 Nationality – If a player played international football, the country/countries he played for are shown. Otherwise, the player's nationality is given as their country of birth.
 Bashundhara Kings career – The year of the player's first appearance for Bashundhara Kings to the year of his last appearance.

References

Bashundhara Kings
Lists of association football players by club
Association football player non-biographical articles